Football Club Gifu (フットボールクラブ岐阜, Futtobōrukurabu Gifu), abbreviated as  is a Japanese football club based in Gifu, Japan. They play in the J3 League, the third tier of Japanese professional football.

History
During the Japan Soccer League and former Japan Football League years, the city and prefecture of Gifu were represented by the Seino Transportation Co. (西濃運輸 Seinō Un'yu) works team, which was relegated from the old JFL for the last time in 1997 and folded shortly thereafter.

The modern-day Gifu club was founded in 2001 (Seino's last manager Masayuki Katsuno was among the founders, and a former Seino player, Takashi Umeda, recently returned to town and joined the club following a decade-long stint with Oita Trinita). The club was promoted to the new Japan Football League in 2007 after beating Honda Lock S.C. in the promotion/relegation play-offs.

The team earned third place at the end of the 2007 season, meaning it qualified for promotion to J. League Division 2. On December 3, 2007, J. League approved a promotion for the team for the 2008 season.

The club finished the 2012 season in 21st place, narrowly missing out on relegation to the Japan Football League.

Between 2013 and 2018, the team has constantly been placed in the lower realms of J. League Division 2 and narrowly avoiding relegation until 2019 when they finished last in the league and were relegated to J. League Division 3.

Crest
The team's crest was designed to represent Gifu Prefecture. The top of the crest represents the mountain ranges of the northern part of the prefecture. The flowers are Chinese milk vetch, which are the prefectural flower. Each of the three lines represents one of the Kiso Three Rivers flowing through the prefecture. The banner at the base of the crest is the same as the symbol on the helmet of the victorious Tokugawa clan at the Battle of Sekigahara in 1600.

League & cup record

Key

Current squad
As of 15 March 2023.

Coaching staff
For the 2023 season.

Managerial history

Kit evolution

Other teams
They also run as a reserve team FC Gifu Second, which currently plays in the Tōkai Adult League Division 2. They have played in the Shakaijin Cup in the past.

References

External links
 F.C. Gifu Official Website 

 
Gifu
Gifu
Gifu
Gifu
Sports teams in Gifu Prefecture
Tourist attractions in Gifu Prefecture
2001 establishments in Japan
Japan Football League clubs
Phoenix clubs (association football)